Archipirata is a monotypic genus of Asian nursery web spiders containing the single species, Archipirata tataricus. It was first described by Eugène Louis Simon in 1898, and is only found in Asia and Turkmenistan.

See also
 List of Pisauridae species

References

Monotypic Araneomorphae genera
Pisauridae
Spiders of Asia